Mateo Bertoša (born 10 August 1988) is a Croatian footballer who plays for Opatija.

Club career
Bertoša made one Croatian Prva HNL appearance for HNK Rijeka before joining NK Jadran Poreč. He then had a short stint with Ergotelis FC in Greece before moving to NK Široki Brijeg. In 2013, he returned to Rijeka.

On 20 September 2018, Bertoša joined Al-Quwa Al-Jawiya in Iraq. He left the club in 2019, and on 4 April, he then joined NK Opatija.

Honours
Široki Brijeg
Bosnia and Herzegovina Cup: 2013

HNK Rijeka
Croatian Cup: 2014

Statistics

References

External links

1988 births
Living people
Sportspeople from Koper
Association football fullbacks
Croatian footballers
HNK Rijeka players
NK Jadran Poreč players
Ergotelis F.C. players
NK Široki Brijeg players
HNK Rijeka II players
NK Istra 1961 players
F.C. Pro Vercelli 1892 players
Al-Quwa Al-Jawiya players
NK Opatija players
Croatian Football League players
Super League Greece players
Premier League of Bosnia and Herzegovina players
First Football League (Croatia) players
Croatian expatriate footballers
Expatriate footballers in Greece
Croatian expatriate sportspeople in Greece
Expatriate footballers in Bosnia and Herzegovina
Croatian expatriate sportspeople in Bosnia and Herzegovina
Expatriate footballers in Italy
Croatian expatriate sportspeople in Italy
Expatriate footballers in Iraq
Croatian expatriate sportspeople in Iraq